The Kops Brewery, founded by Henry Lowenfeld in 1890 was the first brewer of non-alcoholic beer in the United Kingdom.

In December 2014, the renovated building received a blue plaque from the Hammersmith & Fulham Historic Buildings Group, "Kops brewed non-alcoholic ales and stouts on an eight-acre site and exported its products throughout the British Empire".

The building was used after World War II by Convoys food packaging company.

References

External links
 Showing pictures of the site before refurbishment:  accessed 7 November 2016.

Breweries in London
1890 establishments in England
History of the London Borough of Hammersmith and Fulham
Fulham
British companies established in 1890
Food and drink companies established in 1890